Lemmon House may refer to:

Leander Lemmon House, built in Utah around 1901
Bob Lemmon House, built in South Carolina around 1850
G.E. Lemmon House, built in South Dakota in 1908

See also
Lemmon (disambiguation)